Longacre, long acre or longacres may refer to:

General
 Drovers' road#Long acre, wide grassy road verges

Places
 Long Acre, a street in London, England
 Longacre Square, former name for Times Square and Duffy Square in Manhattan, USA
 Longacres, St Albans, England (site of Marconi Instruments)

People with the surname
 James B. Longacre (1794–1869), American engraver
 Robert E. Longacre (1922–2014), American linguist
 Edward Longacre (born 1946), American author

Theatres
 Longacre Theatre, a Broadway theatre, New York, USA
 Queen's Theatre, Long Acre, a former London theatre, England

Horse racing
 Longacres, a former horse-racing track in Washington, USA
 Longacres Mile Handicap, a horse race held now annually at Emerald Downs racetrack in Auburn, Washington, USA

Companies
 Longacre Press, a New Zealand publisher

See also
Acre (disambiguation)